Pseudemoia pagenstecheri, also known commonly as the southern grass tussock skink or the southern tussock grass skink, is a species of lizard in the family Scincidae. The species is endemic to Australia.

Etymology
The specific name, pagenstecheri, is in honour of German zoologist Heinrich Alexander Pagenstecher.

Geographic range
P. pagenstecheri is found in eastern New South Wales, Tasmania, and northeastern Victoria, Australia.

Habitat
The preferred natural habitat of P. pagenstecheri is tussock grassland, especially medium to tall tussock grass.

Reproduction
P. pagenstecheri is viviparous.

Hybridization
P. pagenstecheri is known to hybridize with two other species in its genus, P. cryodroma and P. entrecasteauxii.

Conservation status
The Tussock Skink is listed as 'Least Concern' on the IUCN Red List of Threatened species. However acknowledged that the current population is decreasing, especially in the Western Volcanic Plains of Melbourne. This is further confirmed by the Flora and Fauna Guarantee Act listing the species as 'Endangered' in the Volcanic Plains and in the High Country (alpine) areas. The Flora and Fauna Guarantee Act uses the common assessment method, the method developed and considered best practice by IUCN, (and used to create the Red List).

References

Further reading
Cogger HG (2014). Reptiles and Amphibians of Australia, Seventh Edition. Clayton, Victoria, Australia: CSIRO Publishing. xxx + 1,0333 pp. .
Hutchinson MN, Donnellan SC (1992). "Taxonomy and genetic variation in the Australian lizards of the genus Pseudemoia (Scincidae: Lygosominae)". Journal of Natural History 26 (1): 215–264. (Pseudemoia pagenstecheri, new combination).
Lindholm WA (1901). "Bemerkungen und Beschreibung einer neuen Eidechsenart ". In: Lampe E (1901). "Catalog der Reptilien-Sammlung (Schildkröten, Crocodile, Eidechsen und Chamaeleons) des Naturhistorischens Museums zu Wiesbaden ". Jahrbücher des Nassauischen Vereins für Naturkunde 54: 177–222 + Plate III. {Lygosoma (Liolepisma) pagenstecheri, new species, pp. 214–215 + Plate III, figures 3–5}. (in German).
Wilson S, Swan G (2013). A Complete Guide to Reptiles of Australia, Fourth Edition. Sydney: New Holland Publishers. 522 pp. .

Pseudemoia
Reptiles described in 1901
Skinks of Australia
Endemic fauna of Australia
Taxa named by Wassili Adolfovitch Lindholm